The freguesias (civil parishes) of Portugal are listed in by municipality according to the following format:
 concelho
 freguesias

Óbidos
A dos Negros
Amoreira
Gaeiras
Óbidos (Santa Maria)
Óbidos (São Pedro)
Olho Marinho
Sobral da Lagoa
Usseira
Vau

Odemira
Bicos
Boavista dos Pinheiros
Colos
Longueira/Almograve
Luzianes-Gare
Odemira (Santa Maria)
Odemira (São Salvador)
Pereiras-Gare
Relíquias
Sabóia
Santa Clara-a-Velha
São Luís
São Martinho das Amoreiras
São Teotónio
Vale de Santiago
Vila Nova de Milfontes
Zambujeira do Mar

Odivelas
Caneças
Famões
Odivelas
Olival Basto
Pontinha
Póvoa de Santo Adrião
Ramada

Oeiras
Algés
Barcarena
Carnaxide
Caxias
Cruz Quebrada-Dafundo
Linda-a-Velha
Oeiras e São Julião da Barra
Paço de Arcos
Porto Salvo
Queijas

Oleiros
Álvaro
Amieira
Cambas
Estreito
Isna
Madeirã
Mosteiro
Oleiros
Orvalho
Sarnadas de São Simão
Sobral
Vilar Barroco

Olhão
Fuseta
Moncarapacho
Olhão
Pechão
Quelfes

Oliveira de Azeméis
Carregosa
Cesar
Fajões
Loureiro
Macieira de Sarnes
Macinhata da Seixa
Madail
Nogueira do Cravo
Oliveira de Azeméis
Ossela
Palmaz
Pindelo
Pinheiro da Bemposta
Santiago da Riba-Ul
São Martinho da Gândara
São Roque
Travanca
Ul
Vila de Cucujães

Oliveira de Frades
Arca
Arcozelo das Maias
Destriz
Oliveira de Frades
Pinheiro
Reigoso
Ribeiradio
São João da Serra
São Vicente de Lafões
Sejães
Souto de Lafões
Varzielas

Oliveira do Bairro
Bustos
Mamarrosa
Oiã
Oliveira do Bairro
Palhaça
Troviscal

Oliveira do Hospital
Aldeia das Dez
Alvoco das Várzeas
Avô
Bobadela
Ervedal
Lagares
Lagos da Beira
Lajeosa
Lourosa
Meruge
Nogueira do Cravo
Oliveira do Hospital
Penalva de Alva
Santa Ovaia
São Gião
São Paio de Gramaços
São Sebastião da Feira
Seixo da Beira
Travanca de Lagos
Vila Franca da Beira
Vila Pouca da Beira

Ourém
Alburitel
Atouguia
Casal dos Bernardos
Caxarias
Cercal
Espite
Fátima
Formigais
Freixianda
Gondemaria
Matas
Nossa Senhora da Piedade
Nossa Senhora das Misericórdias
Olival
Ribeira do Fárrio
Rio de Couros
Seiça
Urqueira

Ourique
Conceição
Garvão
Ourique
Panóias
Santa Luzia
Santana da Serra

Ovar

Arada
Cortegaça
Esmoriz
Maceda
Ovar
São João
São Vicente de Pereira Jusã
Válega

O